Chaoshan railway station is a railway station located in Shaxi Town in the Chao'an District of Chaozhou City, Guangdong Province, China, on the Xiashen Railway operated by the Guangzhou Railway (Group) Corp., China Railway Corporation.

Structure

Service
As of January 2014, Chaoshan station is a major station on the Xiamen-Shenzhen Railway, and is a terminus station for the G-series Guangzhou-Chaoshan route, starting at Guangzhou South railway station. The station also operates D-series trains, with destinations including Shenzhen, Xiamen, Hangzhou and Shanghai. It is expected that there will be connections to Hong Kong and Meizhou. Services to Meizhou are also available after the opening of Meizhou-Chaoshan railway on 11 October 2019.

History
The station began operations on 28 December 2013.

Gallery

References

Railway stations in Guangdong
Railway stations in China opened in 2013